Darreh-ye Talkh is a village in Seydun-e Shomali Rural District, Seydun District, Bagh-e Malek County, Khuzestan Province, Iran. As of the 2006 census, its population was 196 with there being 38 families.

References 

Populated places in Bagh-e Malek County